Giovanni II Cornaro, sometimes Corner (4 August 1647 – 12 August 1722) was a Venetian nobleman and statesman; he served as the 111th Doge of Venice from 22 May 1709 until his death.

Cornaro was born and died in Venice. He was a career statesman from a noble family. During his time as Doge, he led Venice in the last war against the Ottoman Empire, culminating in the signing of the Treaty of Passarowitz in 1718, whereby Venice lost the Morea and her last possessions in the Aegean Sea. He was succeeded as Doge by Sebastiano Mocenigo.

His dogaressa was Laura Cornaro.

References

1647 births
1722 deaths
Republic of Venice people of the Ottoman–Venetian Wars
18th-century Doges of Venice
Giovanni II